Winter Break: Hunter Mountain was an American reality television series that aired on MTV and was moved to MTV2. It premiered on MTV on February 27, 2018. 2 episodes were shown before moving to MTV2. One episode premiered on MTV2 before the channel marathoned the remaining episodes. Multiple members of the cast confirmed its cancellation on Twitter soon after.

Cast

Main
  Taylar Shinn
 Jeffrey Brewer
 Carissa Witham
 Jillian Metz
 Alex Shinder
 Alessandra Camerlingo
 Marc Vindas
 Taylor James

Episodes

References

MTV original programming
MTV2 original programming
2018 American television series debuts
2018 American television series endings
2010s American reality television series